Tregrehan Mills is a hamlet west of St Blazey, Cornwall, England, United Kingdom.

See also
Tregrehan House

References

Hamlets in Cornwall